Damrémont is a commune in France.

It may also refer to:
 Charles-Marie Denys de Damrémont - a French officer during the conquest of Algeria.